Ballarat Airport (known officially as the Ballarat Aerodrome)  is located  west of Ballarat in the outer suburb of Mitchell Park, Victoria, Australia.

History
Pilot training was first offered on the Ballarat Common in 1914–15. In 1934, the airport was formalised with the construction of a tin hangar.

No. 1 Wireless Air Gunners School (1 WAGS)
In 1940, the site was resumed by the Commonwealth of Australia, and a Royal Australian Air Force (RAAF) airfield known as Empire Air Training Scheme No 1 Wireless Air Gunners School was established (EATS 1 WAGS) at the Ballarat Showgrounds on 22 April 1940.

The hangar already on the site was relocated to the Commonwealth Flax Mill, and four Bellman hangars and numerous "P" (personnel) Huts were erected. In mid-1940, the Wireless Air Gunners School relocated to the aerodrome. During its operation as a WAGS, the wireless operators were mainly trained in panel vans and, from mid-1941, in CAC Wackett trainer aircraft.

The Wackett was used up until 1941, and then an Avro Anson was used up until 1945. The Avro Anson was a twin-engined aeroplane, coloured yellow for training purposes. It was flown around the Ballarat region and western Victoria.

No 1 WAGS was disbanded on 31 December 1945.

Post War
Unlike many other EATS sites, the RAAF retained the airfield as its Radio School until 1961. The then-Shire of Ballarat negotiated with the Department of Interior to become the civil operator of the airfield and sought the maintenance on site of the hangars and other structures, but a majority of the P Huts were sold by the Commonwealth.

In 2006, the aerodrome was recommended for listing on the Victorian Heritage Register due to its ability to illustrate the Empire Air Training Scheme in Victoria. The site was included on the register on 27 July 2007.

The aerodrome continues to perform an important role in emergency services operations, civil operations and flight training, and as accommodation for many community groups and organisations. The Ballarat Aviation Museum is located at the airport, as is the Friends of the Anson Air Museum.

Motorsport

The airfield had a brief motor racing career, beginning on Australia Day in 1947 when it held its first motor race meeting. Racing returned in November of both 1950 and 1951, then finally for an International Formula Libre race, the 1961 Victorian Trophy, in February 1961, which was attended by some European Formula One teams. BRM factory drivers Dan Gurney and Graham Hill finished first and second in the major race, the Victoria Trophy, with Ron Flockhart third in a Cooper. Famously on the night before the race Gurney's car was stolen from its hangar and driven into or hidden with, hay bales out on the track with minimal damage.

See also
 United States Army Air Forces in Australia (World War II)
 List of airports in Victoria

References

 Shire of Ballarat History

External links
Ballarat Aviation Museum 
Anson Museum
Heritage Victoria

Airports in Victoria (Australia)
Motorsport venues in Victoria (Australia)
Airfields of the United States Army Air Forces in Australia
Sports venues in Victoria (Australia)
Victorian Heritage Register Grampians (region)
Airport
Airports established in 1914
Defunct motorsport venues in Australia